Luckhurst may refer to:

Brian Luckhurst, English cricketer
David Luckhurst, architect of Friars Quay (Norwich)
Geoffrey Luckhurst, British chemist and 1973 recipient of the Corday-Morgan medal
Mark 'Snake' Luckhurst, member of UK hard rock band Thunder
Mary Luckhurst, Professor in Modern Drama and Editor
Michael Christopher Wilbert "Mick" Luckhurst, American football placekicker
Tim Luckhurst, academic, journalist and former editor of The Scotsman